The New York Foundation for the Arts (NYFA) is an independent 501(c)(3) charity, funded through government, foundation, corporate, and individual support, established in 1971. It is part of a network of national not-for-profit arts organizations founded to support individual artists and emerging arts organizations, with a mission to "empower artists in all disciplines at critical stages in their creative lives."

History
NYFA was founded in 1971 by the New York State Council on the Arts as an independent organization to facilitate the development of arts activities throughout the State. NYFA has since expanded their programming around the country and internationally focusing on four core program areas: Artists' Fellowships, Fiscal Sponsorship, Professional Development, and Online Resources. As of 2021, the Executive Director is Michael Royce, who succeeded long time leader Ted Berger.

Notable artists
Artists who have received support from NYFA early on in their careers include Spike Lee, David Hammons, Meredith Monk, Julie Taymor, E.V. Day, George Ranalli, Suzan-Lori Parks, Jennifer Egan, Tony Kushner, Andres Serrano, Juan Gonzalez, Todd Haynes, Boryana Rossa, Lisa Park, Ina Norris, Flavio Alves, Catherine Lacey, Trisha Brown, Norman Rush, Lynne Sharon Schwartz, Sherrie Levine, Jackson Mac Low, Lynne Tillman, Shilpa Ananth and many other visual artists, writers, choreographers, architects, filmmakers, and inter-disciplinary artists. In 2011, NYFA established the NYFA Hall of Fame to honor patrons of the arts and notable artists who have received NYFA's support.

References

External links

Arts foundations based in the United States
Arts organizations based in New York City
Arts organizations established in 1971
1971 establishments in New York (state)